Percy Gates Morgan (2 September 1867 – 26 November 1927) was a notable New Zealand geologist and science administrator. He was born in Richmond, Tasmania, Australia, on 2 September 1867.

References

1867 births
1927 deaths
20th-century New Zealand geologists
Australian emigrants to New Zealand